The Miss Earth Zimbabwe is a beauty pageant promoting environmental protection and  selects a national delegate for the international Miss Earth pageant, one of the four largest and most famous female international beauty pageants referred as the  Big Four international beauty pageants.

History
The Miss Earth Zimbabwe pageant was established to empower young Zimbabwean women in promoting sustainable living, environmental protection, wildlife conservation, natural resource management, and to promote various tourist destinations in Zimbabwe.

The winners and candidates of Miss Earth Zimbabwe participate in environmental awareness program and education including visiting schools to encourage proper food management and educate children in finding solutions to food wastage.

The Miss Earth Zimbabwe pageant was first represented in the international Miss Earth pageant in 2007 by Miss Earth Zimbabwe 2007, Myome Omar.

In 2011, Thandi Muringa, Miss Earth Zimbabwe 2011 became the first representative from Zimbabwe to enter in the Top 8 finalists in the international Miss Earth 2011 competition, held at the University of the Philippines in Quezon City, Metro Manila, Philippines on December 4, 2011.

Muringa became the national director of Miss Earth Zimbabwe's pageant in 2012. She is also the chairperson of the Miss Earth Zimbabwe Foundation- the environmental-arm of the pageant that promotes the green schools project which benefited and served thousands of children from various schools in partnership with the Zimbabwe Ministry of Environment, Water and Climate's Environmental Management Agency(EMA), Tetrad Tree Foundation among others.

In 2013, Miss Earth Zimbabwe, Samantha Dika won the national Women’s Philanthropic Award for her outstanding achievements in Green Awareness activities awarded by the Zimbabwe Philanthropy Institution.

Titleholders
Color key

References

Zimbabwe
Beauty pageants in Zimbabwe
Recurring events established in 2011
Zimbabwean awards